Emily Chancellor (born 20 August 1991) is an Australian rugby union player. She plays in the Loose Forwards for Australia and the NSW Waratahs in the Super W competition.

Biography 
Chancellor made her international debut for the Wallaroos on 18 August 2018 against New Zealand in a Bledesloe double header at the ANZ Stadium in Sydney. She was named Wallaroos Player of Year in 2018.

Chancellor was named in the Australian squad for test matches against Fiji and Japan in May 2022. She was then named in the squad for the 2022 Pacific Four Series. She started against the Black Ferns in the opening match of the Pacific Four series on 6 June.

Chancellor also made the Wallaroos squad for the two-test series against the Black Ferns for the Laurie O'Reilly Cup. She was selected in the team again for the delayed 2022 Rugby World Cup in New Zealand.

References

External links
Wallaroos Profile

Living people
Australia women's international rugby union players
Australian female rugby union players
1991 births